This article lists potential candidates for the Democratic nomination for Vice President of the United States in the 2020 presidential election. Former Vice President Joe Biden of Delaware, the 2020 Democratic nominee for President of the United States, considered several prominent Democrats and other individuals before selecting Senator Kamala Harris of California as his running mate on August 11, 2020. Harris formally won the vice presidential nomination on August 19, 2020, at the 2020 Democratic National Convention. The Biden–Harris ticket would go on to win the 2020 election, defeating the incumbent Republican ticket of Trump–Pence.

In March 2020, Biden promised to select a woman as his running mate, which marked the third time that the vice presidential nominee of a major party in the United States has been a woman, after Geraldine Ferraro in 1984 and Sarah Palin in 2008.

Harris became the vice president upon inauguration in January 2021 alongside President Joe Biden. She is the first woman to be vice president of the United States, making her the highest-ranking woman in U.S. history, and she is also the first Asian American and African American vice president.

Selection process
At the March 15, 2020 Democratic primary debate between former Vice President Joe Biden and Senator Bernie Sanders of Vermont, Biden committed to selecting a woman as his running mate. At that same debate, Sanders stated that he would likely do the same, but did not pledge to do so. Biden became the presumptive presidential nominee after Sanders dropped out on April 8, though the Democratic ticket would not be officially nominated until the 2020 Democratic National Convention in August 2020. With his pledge, his running mate became the third woman to be the vice presidential nominee of a major party in United States history, following Democrat Geraldine Ferraro in 1984 and Republican Sarah Palin in 2008.

Biden indicated that he would make his selection on the basis of shared political beliefs and past experience. He noted that his selection would likely be younger than he is and that he would likely pick someone who is "ready on Day 1 to be president." On April 30, it was announced that the vetting committee would consist of Lisa Blunt Rochester, Chris Dodd, Eric Garcetti, and Cynthia Hogan.

Announcement

Biden had initially planned to make his announcement regarding his running mate selection "around" August 1. The announcement date was later pushed back to the second week in August. On August 11, it was reported that Biden had selected his running mate and an announcement was imminent.

Later that day, Kamala Harris was revealed as Biden's vice presidential running mate. Harris was the junior U.S. senator from California, first elected in 2016. She additionally has experience as the Attorney General of California, San Francisco District Attorney, and as a prosecutor. Harris was a candidate in the 2020 Democratic Party presidential primaries, before suspending her campaign in December 2019, later endorsing Biden's campaign in March 2020. Harris was the third woman vice presidential running mate of a major party and the first Asian American. Harris additionally is the first Democrat from the Western United States to appear on a presidential ticket; Barack Obama was born in Hawaii, a Western state, but was nominated as a representative of Illinois.

Vetting process

Finalists 
On August 13, The New York Times reported the four finalists were Kamala Harris, Susan Rice, Elizabeth Warren, and Gretchen Whitmer.

Shortlist 
The Biden campaign was reported to have begun the vetting process of potential running mates in May 2020. The following officials were reported to have undergone vetting by the Biden campaign. However, following the George Floyd protests, Amy Klobuchar was criticized for her lack of prosecution of police misconduct during her tenure as Hennepin County County Attorney, including a case involving the officer who murdered Floyd. On June 18, she announced that she had removed herself from consideration and urged for Biden to select a woman of color.

On June 12, the Associated Press reported that Keisha Lance Bottoms, Val Demings, Kamala Harris, Michelle Lujan Grisham, Susan Rice, and Elizabeth Warren had advanced to further stages in the vetting process, with the possibility that some other vetted candidates had as well. On June 26, CNN reported that Bottoms, Demings, Harris, and Warren were at that point the leading candidates for the nomination.

On July 29, just a week before Biden's initially planned announcement, The Hill reported that Karen Bass, Harris, Rice, and Warren had emerged as the "top tier" of candidates. On August 2, CNN reported that Tammy Duckworth and Gretchen Whitmer were also still under consideration. On August 10, The New York Times reported that Biden's running mate committee had finished interviewing the possible candidates and that an announcement was "imminent".

In addition to the four finalists, the following individuals were reported to be on Biden's shortlist.

Declined to be considered
The following individuals publicly confirmed that they had declined to be vetted by the Biden campaign.

Media speculation about other potential running mates

The following individuals received coverage as potential running mates from multiple news sources, but were not reported to have been asked to undergo vetting by the Biden campaign.

Federal executive branch officials

Members of Congress

Governors

Mayors

Other individuals

Opinion polling
A Siena College/The New York Times poll released on June 26, 2020 found that over 80% of respondents said that race should not be a factor in Biden's selection.

A Politico/Morning Consult poll released on July 15, 2020, found that 54% of respondents felt that Biden's VP pick will not affect their vote, 16% said it would have a major impact, and 20% said only a minor impact.

See also
 Joe Biden 2020 presidential campaign
 2020 Democratic Party presidential candidates
 2020 Democratic Party presidential primaries
 2020 Democratic National Convention
 2020 United States presidential election
 List of United States major party presidential tickets

Footnotes

References

2020 in women's history
Joe Biden
Joe Biden 2020 presidential campaign
Vice presidency of the United States
Michael Bloomberg
Steve Bullock (American politician)
Pete Buttigieg
Julian Castro
Hillary Clinton
Andrew Cuomo
Tulsi Gabbard
Kirsten Gillibrand
Kamala Harris
Tim Kaine
Amy Klobuchar
Michelle Obama
Nancy Pelosi
Bernie Sanders
Elizabeth Warren